Dizé milé is a beignet stuffed with pastry cream found in French Guianan cuisine. They can be served with a scoop of ice cream or sorbet and champagne.

See also
 Countess (cake)
 Dokonon

References

French Guianan cuisine
Stuffed desserts
Choux pastry